Bärbel is a German-language feminine given name, often a diminutive or variant of the name Barbara.

Individuals bearing the name Bärbel include:

Bärbel Bas (born 1968), German politician
Bärbel Bendiks, East German rower
Bärbel Beuermann (born 1955), German politician
Bärbel Bohley (1945–2010), East German dissident and artist
Bärbel Broschat (born 1957), East German hurdler
Bärbel Dieckmann (born 1949), German politician
Bärbel Fuhrmann (born 1940), German swimmer
Bärbel Graf, East German high jumper
Bärbel Grimmer (born 1945), East German swimmer
Bärbel Höhn (born 1952), German politician
Bärbel Hönisch (born 1974), German paleoceanographer, paleoclimatologist, author, and professor
Bärbel Inhelder (1913–1997), Swiss psychologist 
Bärbel Jungmeier (born 1975), Austrian road cyclist and mountain bike rider
Bärbel Kampmann (1946–1999), German psychologist, writer, and civil servant
Bärbel Kofler (born 1967), German politician
Bärbel Koribalski (born 1964), German astronomer
Bärbel Körner, West German slalom canoeist
Bärbel Köster (born 1957), East German sprint canoer
Bärbel-Maria Kurth (born 1954), German statistician and epidemiologist
Bärbel Löhnert (born 1942), East German long jumper
Bärbel Martin (born 1940), West German figure skater
Bärbel Mayer (born 1935), East German sprinter
Bärbel Mohr (1964–2010), German author
Bärbel Podeswa (born 1946), East German hurdler
Bärbel Richter, East German slalom canoeist
Bärbel Röhl (born 1950), German actress
Bärbel Schäfer (born 1963), German television presenter and talk show host
Bärbel Struppert (born 1950), East German sprinter 
Bärbel Wartenberg-Potter (born 1943), German theologian
Bärbel Wöckel (born 1955), East German sprinter

References

Feminine given names
German feminine given names